is the 12th major single (16th counting the indies) by the Japanese idol group S/mileage, released in Japan on November 28, 2012.

Background 
The song was premiered live at the concert held on September 29 at Yokohama Blitz.

The single was released in four versions: Limited Edition A, Limited Edition B, Limited Edition C, Limited Edition D, and Regular Edition. Each edition has a different cover. All the limited editions are shipped sealed and include a serial-numbered entry card for the lottery to win a ticket to one of the single's launch events. The limited editions A, B, and C include a bonus DVD with a different version of the music video for the title track.

Track listing

Bonus 
Sealed into all the limited editions
 Event ticket lottery card with a serial number

Charts

DVD single 
The corresponding DVD single (so called Single V) was released a week later, on December 5.

Track listing

References

External links 
 CD single, profile on the Hello! Project official website - Hello! Project
 CD single, profile on the Up-Front Works official website - Up-Front Works
 Single V, profile on the Hello! Project official website
 Single V, profile on the Up-Front Works official website

2012 singles
Japanese-language songs
Angerme songs
Songs written by Tsunku
Song recordings produced by Tsunku
2012 songs